Ephemerella excrucians, the pale morning dun, is a species of spiny crawler mayfly in the family Ephemerellidae. It is found in all of Canada and the continental United States.

References

 Jacobus, L. M., and W. P. McCafferty (2003). "Revisionary contributions to North American Ephemerella and Serratella (Ephemeroptera: Ephemerellidae)". Journal of the New York Entomological Society, vol. 111, no. 4, 174-193.
 Walsh, Benjamin D. (1862). "List of the Pseudoneuroptera of Illinois contained in the Cabinet of the writer, with descriptions of over forty new species, and notes on their structural affinities". Proceedings of the Academy of Natural Sciences of Philadelphia, vol. 14, no. 7-9, 361-402.

Further reading

 Arnett, Ross H. (2000). American Insects: A Handbook of the Insects of America North of Mexico. CRC Press.

External links

 NCBI Taxonomy Browser, Ephemerella excrucians

Mayflies